Harthofia is an extinct genus of shrimp in the order Decapoda.

References

Caridea
Jurassic crustaceans
Fossils of Germany